Ihar Yuryevich Tsaplyuk (Igor Yuryevich Tsaplyuk; born 15 July 1970) is a former Belarusian football player.

Between 2004 and 2010 he worked at Torpedo Zhodino as director and sports director. Since 2012, he is working at Football Federation of Belarus.

References

1970 births
Living people
Soviet footballers
Belarusian footballers
Belarusian expatriate footballers
Expatriate footballers in Russia
Russian Premier League players
FC Starye Dorogi players
FC KAMAZ Naberezhnye Chelny players
FC Luninets players
FC Granit Mikashevichi players
FC Torpedo-BelAZ Zhodino players
Association football defenders
FC Neftekhimik Nizhnekamsk players